

<div id="29_February_2008"> </div id>

29 February 2008 (Friday)
Baseball:
A U.S. federal judge in San Francisco orders the unsealing of Barry Bonds' grand jury testimony in a December 2003 hearing on steroids in baseball. Bonds currently faces four counts of perjury and one count of obstruction of justice for allegedly lying 19 times during this testimony. (AP via Yahoo!)
Cricket:
2007–08 Commonwealth Bank Series
12th match- 221 (50 ov.) beat  208 (48.1 ov.) by 13 runs.
<div id="28_February_2008"> </div id>

28 February 2008 (Thursday)

<div id="27_February_2008"> </div id>

27 February 2008 (Wednesday)

<div id="26_February_2008"> </div id>

26 February 2008 (Tuesday)
Cricket
2007–08 Commonwealth Bank Series
11th Match- 180/3 (32.2 ov.) beat  179 (47.1 ov.) by 7 wickets
Ice hockey
National Hockey League
The trade deadline for the 2007–08 season occurs at 3 pm EST, with 25 trades involving 45 players.
U.S. college basketball:
 In their first game after reaching No. 1 in both major polls for the first time in school history, Tennessee loses 72–69 to Vanderbilt (#18 AP, No. 14 Coaches) in Nashville. This is the second straight season in which the Commodores have knocked off a top-ranked SEC opponent at home; last year's team knocked off eventual national champion Florida.

<div id="25_February_2008"> </div id>

25 February 2008 (Monday)
Auto racing:
NASCAR Sprint Cup Auto Club 500 in Fontana, California
(1) Carl Edwards  (2) Jimmie Johnson  (3) Jeff Gordon 

<div id="24_February_2008"> </div id>

24 February 2008 (Sunday)
 Auto racing:
2008 V8 Supercar season: Clipsal 500, at Adelaide Street Circuit, South Australia, Australia:
(1) Jamie Whincup  (2) Lee Holdsworth  (3) Cameron McConville 
NASCAR Sprint Cup: The Auto Club 500 in Fontana, California is red-flagged twice due to hazardous conditions from a combination of rain and water seepage at the track, and finally halted after 87 of 250 laps. The race will resume on Monday.
 Football (Soccer):
 2008 Football League Cup Final
 Chelsea 1–2 Tottenham Hotspur (aet)
A-League Grand Final 2008
Central Coast Mariners 0–1 Newcastle United Jets
 2008 Pan-Pacific Championship Finals at Aloha Stadium, Honolulu, Hawaii
 Final: Houston Dynamo 1 – 6 Gamba Osaka Baré showed dominance over North America's premier league, scoring four goals and carrying the J. League side to the PPC title.
 Third-Place Game: Los Angeles Galaxy 2 – 1 Sydney FC The Galaxy got revenge on Sydney for their earlier friendly loss, with David Beckham assisting on both L.A. goals.
 Golf:
 Tiger Woods easily defeats Stewart Cink 8 and 7 in the 36-hole final to win the WGC-Accenture Match Play Championship in Marana, Arizona. The win, his 15th World Golf Championships individual title, makes him the first player ever to hold all three individual WGC titles simultaneously, and also gives him sole possession of fourth place on the PGA Tour's career titles list.

<div id="23_February_2008"> </div id>

23 February 2008 (Saturday)
Motorcycle racing 2008:
Superbike: Losail Superbike World Championship round, at Losail International Circuit, Qatar:
Race 1(1) Troy Bayliss  (2) Max Biaggi  (3) Troy Corser 
Race 2(1) Fonsi Nieto  (2) Rubén Xaus  (3) Max Biaggi 
 Rugby union: Six Nations
  47 – 8  at Millennium Stadium, Cardiff
Wales continue their march towards the Grand Slam.
 Ireland 34 – 13  at Croke Park, Dublin
Ireland score five tries in a fine match.
  13 – 24  at Stade de France, Saint-Denis
England put themselves back into contention for the title, and smash France's 100% record.
U.S. college basketball:
 In a showdown between the two top-ranked teams in the country in Memphis, second-ranked Tennessee beats top-ranked Memphis 66–62. The result ends the Tigers' regular-season winning streak at 45 games and their home winning streak at 47, and will almost certainly elevate the Volunteers to No. 1 for the first time in school history.
 The only other game today to feature two ranked teams, the showpiece of ESPN's annual BracketBusters event, sees Drake (#16 AP, No. 18 Coaches) travel to Indianapolis and surprise Butler (#8 in both polls) 71–64. This is Drake's first win over a top-10 team since 1982.
 At the other end of the men's Division I spectrum, NJIT loses 76–50 to Utah Valley, completing an 0–29 season. This sets a new Division I record for losses in a winless season.

<div id="22_February_2008"> </div id>

22 February 2008 (Friday)

 Auto racing:
 The two rival top-level American open-wheel racing organizations, the Indy Racing League and Champ Car, agree to merge for the upcoming 2008 season under the IRL banner, with Champ Car agreeing to fold. This ends a bitter feud that started in 1994 when Tony George, the owner of the Indianapolis Motor Speedway, broke from what was then known as CART to eventually form the IRL. (AP via ESPN)
Basketball
U.S. college basketball:
Indiana announces that it has reached an agreement with its head coach, Kelvin Sampson, that effectively terminates him after a series of scandals became public during the week. Under terms of the deal, IU will pay Sampson $750,000: in return, he resigns and agrees not to pursue any further legal action. His assistant, Dan Dakich, takes over as interim head coach.
Chinese Basketball Association:
Guangdong Southern Tigers 90, Liaoning Hunters 81, Guangdong wins series, 4–1.
The Southern Tigers clinch their 4th CBA title in 5 years.
<div id="21_February_2008"> </div id>

21 February 2008 (Thursday)

<div id="20_February_2008"> </div id>

20 February 2008 (Wednesday)
 Football (soccer): 2008 Pan-Pacific Championship Preliminaries at Aloha Stadium, Honolulu, Hawaii
 Los Angeles Galaxy 0 – 1 Gamba Osaka Baré steals the show from David Beckham, scoring the lone goal and sending the J. League participants to the Final.
 Houston Dynamo 3 – 0 Sydney FC North Shore native Brian Ching has two assists as the MLS Champions stifle the A-League participants.

<div id="19_February_2008"> </div id>

19 February 2008 (Tuesday)

<div id="18_February_2008"> </div id>

18 February 2008 (Monday)
Cricket
2008 U/19 Cricket World Cup
Group A
 U-19 221/8 (50 ov.) beat  U-19 123 (42.4 ov.) by 98 runs
Group B
 U-19 223/7 (43.5 ov.) beat  U-19 222/8 (50 ov.) by 3 wickets
Group C
 U-19 236/9 (50 ov.) beat  U-19 175 (48.5 ov.) by 61 runs
Group D
 U-19 260/8 (50 ov.) beat  U-19 82 (26.2 ov.) by 178 runs

<div id="17_February_2008"> </div id>

17 February 2008 (Sunday)
Auto racing:
NASCAR Sprint Cup Daytona 500 in Daytona Beach, Florida
(1) Ryan Newman  (2) Kurt Busch  (3) Tony Stewart 

Basketball: NBA All-Star Game
East All-Stars 134, West All-Stars 128; LeBron James named game MVP, the second All-Star MVP honor of his career.
Cricket
2007–08 Commonwealth Bank Series
 203/9 (50 ov.) beat  153 (41.2 ov.) by 50 runs
2008 U/19 Cricket World Cup
Group A
 U-19 76/2 (9.3 ov.) beat  U-19 75 (24.4 ov.) by 8 wickets
Group B
 U-19 280/5 (50 ov.) beat  U-19 85 (28 ov.) by 195 runs
Group C
 U-19 312 (48 ov.) beat  U-19 163 (31 ov.) by 149 runs
Group D
 U-19 110/0 (15.5 ov.) beat  U-19 109 (31.2 ov.) by 10 wickets

16 February 2008 (Saturday)
Basketball: NBA All-Star Saturday Night
Slam Dunk Contest: Orlando Magic's Dwight Howard defeated Gerald Green of the Minnesota Timberwolves in the final round to win the contest.
Other competitors:
Rudy Gay (Memphis Grizzlies)
Jamario Moon (Toronto Raptors)
Three-Point Shootout: Jason Kapono of the Raptors defended his three-point shootout championship as he scored 25 points to tie the record set by Craig Hodges in the 1986 contest.
Other competitors:
Daniel Gibson (Cleveland Cavaliers)
Richard Hamilton (Detroit Pistons)
Steve Nash (Phoenix Suns)
Dirk Nowitzki (Dallas Mavericks)
Peja Stojaković (New Orleans Hornets)
Skills Challenge: Deron Williams of the Utah Jazz set a new record with 25.5 seconds beating Chris Paul of the Hornets in the final round.
Other competitors
Dwyane Wade (Miami Heat)
Jason Kidd (New Jersey Nets).
Shooting Stars Competition: Team San Antonio (Tim Duncan (Spurs), Becky Hammon (Silver Stars) and David Robinson (Spurs 1989–2003)) topped the field with 35.8 seconds.
Other competitors:
Team Chicago (Chris Duhon (Bulls), Candice Dupree (Sky) and B. J. Armstrong (Bulls 1989–95, 1999–2000))
Team Detroit (Chauncey Billups (Pistons), Swin Cash (Shock) and Bill Laimbeer (Pistons 1981–1994))
Team Phoenix (Amar'e Stoudemire (Suns), Cappie Pondexter (Mercury) and Eddie Johnson (Suns 1987–90))
 Commissioner David Stern says that he expects the Seattle SuperSonics to move to Oklahoma City, either after this season or when the team's lease at KeyArena expires in 2010. He also states that while he is interested in expanding the league to Europe, the league has no plans for such a move at this time, contrary to a report by Sports Illustrated. (AP via ESPN)
 
<div id="15_February_2008"> </div id>

15 February 2008 (Friday)
Basketball: NBA All-Star Weekend
Rookie Challenge: Sophomores 136, Rookies 109; Daniel Gibson was named game MVP.
<div id="14_February_2008"> </div id>

14 February 2008 (Thursday)
Auto racing
The 2008 NASCAR Gatorade Duels (qualifying races for the 2008 Daytona 500) are won by Dale Earnhardt Jr. and Denny Hamlin.
<div id="13_February_2008"> </div id>

13 February 2008 (Wednesday)

Basketball:
 Sports Illustrated, citing an unnamed league source, reports that NBA commissioner David Stern will announce during the upcoming All-Star Weekend that the league plans in the next decade to create a European division with five teams. (SI.com)
Cycling:
 The organiser of the Tour de France announces that the Astana Team will be excluded from the 2008 Tour due to the team's past doping issues, including its links to the Operación Puerto case in 2006 and involvement in the Tour's 2007 doping scandals. Among the cyclists barred from the 2008 Tour will be two of the podium finishers from 2007, champion Alberto Contador and third-place Levi Leipheimer. (AP via ESPN)

<div id="12_February_2008"> </div id>

12 February 2008 (Tuesday)

<div id="11_February_2008"> </div id>

11 February 2008 (Monday)

<div id="10_February_2008"> </div id>

10 February 2008 (Sunday)

 American football: Pro Bowl at Honolulu
 In the final game of the NFL season, the NFC beats the AFC 42–30 behind two touchdowns apiece from Adrian Peterson and Terrell Owens. Peterson is named the game's MVP, becoming only the second rookie (after Marshall Faulk in 1995) so honored.
 Association football: 2008 Africa Cup of Nations:
Final:  0 – 1 
Egypt win their second successive, and record sixth in total, Africa Cup of Nations title.
Auto racing:
2008 World Rally Championship: 57th Uddeholm Swedish Rally, in Sweden:
(1) Jari-Matti Latvala  (2) Mikko Hirvonen  (3) Gigi Galli 
Jimmie Johnson won the pole position for the NASCAR Sprint Cup Series Daytona 500.
 Rugby union:
 Six Nations
  19 – 23  at Stadio Flaminio, Rome
 England labour to an unconvincing win over Italy.
 USA Sevens at San Diego
 Cup:  27 – 12 
 During their march to the crown, New Zealand set an all-time record with 35 consecutive match wins in the IRB Sevens World Series by defeating  in the Cup semifinals. They took their record to 36 by winning the Cup. They are also the first team ever to win the first four tournaments of an IRB Sevens season.
Plate:  26 – 21  (extra time)
Bowl:  19 – 21 
Shield:  12 – 24 

<div id="9_February_2008"> </div id>

9 February 2008 (Saturday)
American football: The Washington Redskins hire Jim Zorn as head coach, according to the Associated Press. Zorn is a former Seattle Seahawks quarterback and had served as Seattle's quarterbacks coach for seven years. (AP)
 Association football: 2008 Africa Cup of Nations:
Third-place match:  4 – 2  
 Rugby union: Six Nations
  30 – 15  at Millennium Stadium, Cardiff
As last week, Wales improved strongly as the game proceeded, and are looking for a Grand Slam.
  26 – 21 Ireland at Stade de France, Saint-Denis
Ireland struggle to the last second to push to level the game against France, having gone 19 – 6 behind at half time.

<div id="8_February_2008"> </div id>

8 February 2008 (Friday)

<div id="7_February_2008"> </div id>

7 February 2008 (Thursday)
 Association football: 2008 Africa Cup of Nations:
Semifinal 1:  0 – 1 
The Indomitable Lions eject the Black Stars from their own competition, through Alain Nkong's 71st-minute goal, but Lions will be without André Bikey in Sunday's final following his red card.
Semifinal 2:  1 – 4 
In a dramatic match the Pharaohs thrash the favoured Elephants and make their way to the final to defend their title.
<div id="6_February_2008"> </div id>

6 February 2008 (Wednesday)

<div id="5_February_2008"> </div id>
Basketball: NBA
Shaquille O'Neal is traded from the Miami Heat to the Phoenix Suns in exchange for Shawn Marion and Marcus Banks.

5 February 2008 (Tuesday)

<div id="4_February_2008"> </div id>

4 February 2008 (Monday)
 Association football: 2008 Africa Cup of Nations:
Quarter final 3:  2 – 1 
Quarter final 4:  2 – 3  (a.e.t., 2–2 after 90 minutes)
 Basketball:
 Bob Knight, the winningest coach in NCAA men's Division I history with 902 career wins, unexpectedly resigns as head coach at Texas Tech, effective immediately. His son and designated successor, Pat, takes over. (ESPN)

<div id="3_February_2008"> </div id>

3 February 2008 (Sunday)
 American football:
 Super Bowl XLII at Glendale, Arizona: New York Giants 17, New England Patriots 14
 With a fierce defense led by defensive linemen Michael Strahan and Justin Tuck and a productive final drive fueled by wide receiver David Tyree, the Giants shock the heavily favored and previously unbeaten Patriots and become World Champions. After three quarters dominated by defensive play, New England goes ahead, 14–10, on a Tom Brady touchdown pass to Randy Moss with 2:42 left. The Giants reach striking range on a circus catch by the little-used Tyree, setting up the game-winning touchdown pass from quarterback Eli Manning to a wide-open Plaxico Burress with 35 seconds left in the game. Manning finishes 19-for-34 for 255 yards, two touchdowns and an interception. Even though many observers consider Tuck to be more deserving, Manning is selected Most Valuable Player. With the upset, the 1972 Miami Dolphins remain the only NFL team to complete a season undefeated from opening regular season game to the Super Bowl.
 With 97.5 million viewers, Super Bowl XLII is the most-watched Super Bowl in history, and the second-most watched television event in American television history.
 Association football: 2008 Africa Cup of Nations:
Quarter final 1:  2 – 1 
Quarter final 2:  5 – 0 
Auto racing:
2007–08 A1 Grand Prix season: A1 Grand Prix of Nations, Australia, at Eastern Creek Raceway, New South Wales, Australia:
(1) Adrian Zaugg  (2) Neel Jani  (3) Robbie Kerr 
 Rugby union: Six Nations
  6 – 27  at Murrayfield, Edinburgh
Tennis
2008 Movistar Open – Singles final
 Fernando González def.  Juan Mónaco; González was handed title by default after Mónaco injured himself.
2008 Movistar Open – Doubles final
 José Acasuso /  Sebastián Prieto def.  Máximo González /  Juan Mónaco, 6–1, 3–0, ret.

<div id="2_February_2008"> </div id>

2 February 2008 (Saturday)
 Rugby union: Six Nations
 Ireland 16–11  at Croke Park, Dublin
 Ireland start the competition with a lackluster home win.
  19–26  at Twickenham, London
 Wales defeat England at Twickenham for the first time since 1988 after England blow a 19–6 lead in the final 25 minutes.
 American football:
 NFL: 2008 Pro Football Hall of Fame Inductees announced.
 College football bowl game
 Texas vs. The Nation Game, El Paso, Texas – Texas 41, The Nation 14
 In college football's final post-season game, Erick Jackson of the Texas Longhorns returned a 50-yard fumble for a touchdown that helped the Texas squad obtain victory over the Nation all-stars.
Basketball
U.S. college:
Memphis 70, UTEP 64 – The No. 1 team in the country survives a scare from the Miners. Chris Douglas-Roberts had 24 points and 7 rebounds, while UTEP star Stefon Jackson had 27 in the loss.
Georgetown 73, Seton Hall 61 – The Pirates' five-game winning streak is ended by the No. 6 Hoyas. Jessie Sapp led the team with 17 points.

<div id="1_February_2008"> </div id>

1 February 2008 (Friday)

Basketball: NBA
Pau Gasol is traded from the Memphis Grizzlies to the Los Angeles Lakers. (AFP)

References

02